Garvin may refer to:

People
Steven Girvin (born in 1950), American physicist
Tommy Girvin, American guitarist

Places
Girvin, community in Iowa
Girvin, community in Texas
Girvin, former village in Saskatchewan

See also
Girvin (born in 2014),  American Thoroughbred racehorse